Adam Laczkó (born 2 April 1997) is a Slovak footballer who plays for Fortuna Liga club Slovan Bratislava as a centre back.

Club career

ŠK Slovan Bratislava
Laczkó made his Fortuna Liga debut for Slovan Bratislava on 13 August 2016 against Ružomberok.

References

External links
 ŠK Slovan Bratislava profile
 
 Futbalnet profile

1997 births
Living people
Footballers from Bratislava
Slovak footballers
Slovakia youth international footballers
Association football defenders
ŠK Slovan Bratislava players
AS Trenčín players
2. Liga (Slovakia) players
Slovak Super Liga players